Kakul (Kakol) is a village situated in the Tehsil and District Abbottabad, at an elevation of 1300 metres, 5 km northeast of center of Abbottabad city near the Thandiani Hills. Abbottabad is a District of Khyber-Pakhtunkhwa province of Pakistan. The population is around 30,000. It is also  famous for The Pakistan Military Academy (PMA), also known as PMA Kakul, that is Officer Training Academy of Pakistan Army. The posterior gate of PMA is also named as Kakul gate owing to its proximity with the village.

History
Kakul was a rural area prior to the establishment of a Boer Prisoner of War camp during the Boer War, circa 1899–1902, by the (then) Government of British India. This site was placed under the official management of the 5th Royal Gurkha Rifles. Later on, the POW camp was converted into an army mountaineering and PT school until 1947–48, and a portion of it also remained the offices of the Royal Indian Army Service Corps (RIASC). It was this site, which was later chosen for the new post-independence Pakistan Military Academy, which is located in the eastern side of the valley.

See also
 Killing of Osama bin Laden

References

Union councils of Abbottabad District
Populated places in Abbottabad District
Populated places established in 1957

fr:Kakul